Archie James McDowell (1863–1938) was a member of the State Assembly, Wisconsin, United States.

Biography
McDowell was born in Avon, Wisconsin. He moved with his parents to Crawford County, Wisconsin in 1870. In 1898, he graduated from what is now the Medical College of Wisconsin. He was the father of Wisconsin assemblyman Donald C. McDowell.

Political career
McDowell was elected to the Assembly in 1924, 1926 and 1928. Other positions he held include president (similar to mayor) of Soldiers Grove, Wisconsin. He was a Republican.

References

External links

People from Avon, Wisconsin
People from Soldiers Grove, Wisconsin
Republican Party members of the Wisconsin State Assembly
Mayors of places in Wisconsin
Physicians from Wisconsin
Medical College of Wisconsin alumni
1863 births
1938 deaths